John Belchier (1706 – 6 February 1785) was a British surgeon at Guy's Hospital from 1736 to 1768. He discovered at about the time of his Guy's appointment that the vegetable dye madder stained newly forming bone tissue, opening up the study of the growth and development of the skeleton, which was taken forward by
Henri-Louis Duhamel du Monceau and John Hunter.

Belchier was awarded the Copley Medal by the Royal Society in 1737. He was a founding governor for the Foundling Hospital, a charity created by Royal Charter in 1739, and was a member of the Court of Assistants at the Company of Surgeons from 1751 to 1785.

References

Royal Society page Copley archive winners 1799–1731
Oxford Dictionary of National Biography, List of Copley Medal Winners

1706 births
1785 deaths
English surgeons
British surgeons
Fellows of the Royal Society
Recipients of the Copley Medal
18th-century English people
Place of birth unknown
Place of death missing
Date of birth unknown
Physicians of Guy's Hospital